The 1872 Kincardineshire by-election was held on 10 December 1872.  The byelection was held due to the death of the incumbent Liberal MP, James Dyce Nicol.  It was won by the unopposed Liberal candidate George Balfour.

References

1872 in Scotland
1870s elections in Scotland
Kincardineshire
1872 elections in the United Kingdom
By-elections to the Parliament of the United Kingdom in Scottish constituencies
Unopposed by-elections to the Parliament of the United Kingdom in Scottish constituencies